Francis Otieno Ndege (born August 25, 1979, in Nairobi), nicknamed Franco, is a former Kenyan international cricketer who played as a right-handed opening batsman. 

A former captain of the national under-19 side, he represented his country in four One Day International (ODI) matches in 2010, although he had made his senior debut as early as the 1999–2000 season. 

Otieno's playing career was interrupted by a stint as the coach of the Ugandan national team. He was appointed to the position in November 2007, replacing Sam Walusimbi, and served until July 2008, when he was replaced by South African Barney Mohamed.

References

Cricket Archive

1979 births
Living people
Kenyan cricketers
Kenya One Day International cricketers
Coaches of the Uganda national cricket team
Cricketers from Nairobi
Kenyan expatriate sportspeople in Uganda
Kenyan cricket coaches